Benque Viejo del Carmen ("Benque") is the westernmost town in Belize,  by road west and south of Belize City, at the Guatemalan border. San Ignacio lies 13 km to the east and Melchor de Mencos just across the border. The Mopan River runs along the town's north and west edges.

Historical background
Benque was first settled by Maya from Flores, El Petén, Guatemala. It grew as a lumber camp on the Mopan River that flowed into the Belize River, to the coast at Belize Town. The Mayas had been catechized by Spanish Catholic missionaries, leading to the predominance of the Catholic church in Benque, which holds the earliest Baptismal records in Cayo District from Jesuit Fr. Bavastro in May 1865. In 1877 the town was served by Manuel Ignacio Santa Cruz Loidi, a Basque priest and military leader in the unsuccessful effort to defeat the liberals in Spain's Third Carlist War. During the 1880s Fr. Jose Maria Pinelo, a refugee from Petén during the presidency of Manuel Barillas, visited Benque, remaining from 1887 to 1889. In the 1890s the population was about 500. In 1904 a permanent Catholic residency was established by Jesuit Fr. William “Buck” Stanton. 

Then in 1913, at the persuasion of Jesuit Fr. Versavel, the Pallottine sisters came from Germany and served first in Benque.  Mother (Saint) Katharine Drexel subsidized their convent from her inheritance. On the night of 16 November 1937 a fire destroyed the Church of Our Lady of Mt. Carmel and Fr. Kuenzel undertook to build the new church. In 1950, Kuenzel persuaded the Town Board to name the new football field after Corporal Marchalleck through whose "self-sacrificing interest and persevering efforts [the] football campus came as if by magic out of what was hitherto useless tropical bush.". St. Joseph Convent on the street of that name was completed in 1952. On 18 January 1961 Fr. Sontag, Jesuit pastor in Benque, was found murdered at his desk in the rectory, with a machete the likely weapon. The perpetrator and motive remain a mystery. In 1963 a Catholic primary school building of reinforced concrete was built. The next year the Jesuits handed the parish over to the diocesan clergy, with Fr. Herbert Panton its first native pastor. The Catholic community SOLT increased its presence in Belize from the early 1990s, beginning in Benque. Deacon Cal Cathers of SOLT founded BRC printing in Benque to improve the quality of elementary school textbooks in Belize.

Demographics
Benque has long been the place where tourists and merchants cross to Melchor and purchase Maya textiles. Now Guatemalan youth cross the border each day to receive a secondary education in English. During the first years of the 21st century Benque experienced a rapid boom in population. It offers primary and secondary education, supermarkets, an annual fiesta, and is home to a Belize Premier Football League team. In 2010 its population, mostly of Maya or Mestizo descent, was 5,824 (2,906 males and 2,918 females); households numbered 1,415 with average size 4.1. The ancient Maya ruins of Xunantunich are nearby. Film director Caleb Botton used the town as the backdrop for 7 Days in Carmel which featured Benque's Holy Week processions. As of May 2015, the mayor is Heraldo "Rancha" Ramcharan Jr. of the United Democratic Party, which also controls the town council.

References

Populated places in Cayo District
Cayo West
Belize–Guatemala border crossings